Carlottaemyia moerens is a species of ulidiid or picture-winged fly in the genus Carlottaemyia of the family Ulidiidae.

References

Ulidiidae